Maar Dibsah  is a Syrian village located in Saraqib Nahiyah in Idlib District, Idlib.  According to the Syria Central Bureau of Statistics (CBS), Maar Dibsah had a population of 7074 in the 2004 census.

References 

Populated places in Idlib District